Enakku Veru Engum Kilaigal Kidayathu is a 2016 Indian Tamil-language comedy film written and directed by Ganapathy Balamurugan. The film stars Goundamani, with Soundararaja and Riythvika. Featuring music composed by S. N. Arunagiri, the film began production during June 2016, and was released on 26 August 2016.

Cast
Goundamani as Caravan Krishnan
Soundararaja as Prabha
Riythvika as Divya
Shanoor Sana as Caravan Krishna's Wife
Munnar Ramesh as Divya's Father
Vallavan
Vasagar
Ramachandran Durairaj
Velmurugan

Production
In January 2015, Goundamani accepted terms to work on a film titled Enakku Veru Engum Kilaigal Kidayathu directed by Ganapathy Balamurugan. Along with 49-O (2015) and Vaaimai, the film marked the return of Goundamani to films after a long sabbatical. Goundamani had initially expressed reservations about the film's title, stating it sounded too pompous, but the director convinced him that the title would be apt for the script. Despite beginning shoot in early 2015, the film's release was delayed by over a year. Later the film was released in August 2016 and gained mixed reviews.

References

External links
 

2016 films
2010s Tamil-language films
Indian comedy films
Films shot in Madurai
2016 directorial debut films
2016 comedy films